Sengoku Collection is a 2012 Japanese anime television series by Brain's Base based on a mobile social networking game by Konami. The series follows female versions of generals from the Sengoku period as they are mysteriously sent to the modern world and try to adapt to a new lifestyle. The series aired on TV Tokyo between April 5, 2012 and September 27, 2012 and was simulcast by Crunchyroll.

Insert songs used in episode 2 are "Love Scope" by Kana Hanazawa and "Misty Moon" by Yuka Terasaki.

Episode list

References

https://web.archive.org/web/20120827065710/http://www.tv-tokyo.co.jp/anime/sencolle/index.html

Sengoku Collection